Our Lady and St Peter's Church is a Roman Catholic parish church in Bridlington, East Riding of Yorkshire, England. It was built from 1893 to 1894 in the Gothic Revival style. It is located on the corner of Victoria Road and Wycliffe Lane, close to the town centre. It is a Grade II listed building.

History

Foundation
In 1791, a mission was started in Beverley. In 1846, a church was built there. In 1855, priests from Beverley came to Bridlington to serve the local Catholic population. Mass was celebrated privately in Bridlington in people's homes. In 1867, a room as rented in the Victoria Rooms on Garrison Street by a Fr Henry Green to become St William's Chapel. In 1868, it was recorded that there were 35 Catholics in Bridlington. In 1884, a Fr John Murphy became the priest in Bridlington. He was behind the building of a tin tabernacle church on Prospect Row, which became Wellington Road.

Construction
In 1886, Fr John Murphy's replacement priest, Fr James Clancy bought the site of the current church. The architectural firm Smith, Brodrick & Lowther, from Hull, comprising Richard George Smith, Frederick Stead Broderick and Arthur Randall Lowther, were commissioned to design the church. On 19 August 1893, the foundation stone was laid. On 1 September 1894, the church was opened. The total cost of the church was £1,870 and it was paid for by Mrs Caroline Mousley of the Boynton baronets. From 1895, Dominican sisters ran a school in the parish.

Parish  
Our Lady and St Peter's Church is in the Our Lady Star of the Sea parishes along with St George's Church in Eastfield and St Mary's Church in Filey. Our Lady and St Peter's Church has two Sunday Masses at 6:00pm on Saturday and 9:00am on Sunday. St George's Church in Eastfield has one Sunday Mass at 4:00pm on Saturday and St Mary's Church in Filey has one Sunday Mass at 11:00am.

See also
 Diocese of Middlesbrough

References

External links
 
 Diocesan page on the parish

Bridlington
Grade II listed churches in the East Riding of Yorkshire
Roman Catholic Diocese of Middlesbrough
Grade II listed Roman Catholic churches in England
Gothic Revival church buildings in England
19th-century Roman Catholic church buildings in the United Kingdom
Roman Catholic churches completed in 1894
1894 establishments in England
Roman Catholic churches in the East Riding of Yorkshire